József Verebes (23 March 1941 – 13 March 2016) was a Hungarian football manager and player.

Managerial career

Győr
Verebes became the advisor of his former club Győri ETO in 2011.

Nagytétény SE
On 15 October 2010, Verebes became the coach of Nagytétény SE, competing in the Budapest championship.

References

Sources
Verebes at Magyarfutball 

1941 births
2016 deaths
Hungarian footballers
Association football forwards
Footballers from Budapest
Hungarian football managers
Fehérvár FC managers
Győri ETO FC managers
Nemzeti Bajnokság I managers
MTK Budapest FC managers
Budapest Honvéd FC managers
Ferencvárosi TC footballers
Vasas SC managers
Diósgyőri VTK managers